"Truth prevails" is the national motto of the Czech Republic. The motto appears on the standard of the President of the Czech Republic, which the Czech Constitution designates a national symbol.  Before the dissolution of Czechoslovakia in 1993, the motto was the motto of Czechoslovakia and appeared on the standard of the President of Czechoslovakia as well.

The motto was invented during the First World War by the leader of the Czech independence movement Tomáš Garrigue Masaryk. It was used as a counter-motto to the war propaganda of Austria-Hungary and the Entente powers. The motto is believed to be derived from Jan Hus' phrase "Seek the truth, hear the truth, learn the truth, love the truth, speak the truth, hold the truth and defend the truth until death". The phrase thus appears along the base of the Jan Hus Memorial in Prague. Tomáš Garrigue Masaryk, the first President of Czechoslovakia, adopted the shortened phrase "truth prevails" as a presidential motto shortly after independence from Austria-Hungary in 1918. The sentiment was echoed over 75 years later in Václav Havel's notion of "life in truth" and in his famous statement "Truth and love must prevail over lies and hatred". The Latin version "Veritas vincit" was in use on the presidential banner from 1990 to 1992 as a linguistically neutral compromise reached between Czech and Slovak political representatives.

The concept of truth has a long tradition in Czech political thought. Jan Hus and John Amos Comenius connected the truth with theological aspects, while in Masaryk's ethical concepts truth was seen as the opposite of lie. Hus' credo traditionally had been seen as testifying the moral and spiritual, rather than physical and military strength. The Charter 77 movement had the motto "Truth prevails for those who live in truth".

Other uses
 Part of this motto is used as the tagline for the English version of the  manga and anime series Case Closed ("One Truth Prevails").

 Motto on the crest of Clan Keith of Scotland

 Title of a song by the Slovak rock band, Tublatanka

See also
 Satyameva Jayate, the national motto of India that has the same meaning.

References

National symbols of the Czech Republic
National mottos